Samuel Samo was a Dutch slave trader who was the first person to be prosecuted under the British Slave Trade Felony Act 1811.

Samuel Samo was the uncle of John Samo, a Dutch shopkeeper who served as King's Advocate and Member of His Majesty's Colonial Council of Sierra Leone. Samo was also a colleague of William Henry Leigh.

Samo was based in the Îles de Los, a group of islands of Conakry in modern-day Guinea. He was seized along with Charles Hickson from there in early 1812 and taken to Freetown, Sierra Leone to be put on trial.

The trial was held under the auspices of the Vice admiralty court in Sierra Leone. Robert Thorpe was the presiding judge. Samo was charged with five counts of slave-trading between August 1811 and January 1812.

References

Dutch slave traders
19th-century Dutch businesspeople